Elachista sinevi is a moth in the family Elachistidae. It was described by Sruoga in 1992. It is found in Kazakhstan.

References

Moths described in 1992
sinevi
Moths of Asia